Sodium trimetaphosphate (also STMP), with formula Na3P3O9, is one of the metaphosphates of sodium. It has the formula  but the hexahydrate  is also well known. It is the sodium salt of trimetaphosphoric acid.  It is a colourless solid that finds specialised applications in food and construction industries.

Although drawn with a particular resonance structure, the trianion has high symmetry.

Synthesis and reactions
Trisodium trimetaphosphate is produced industrially by heating sodium dihydrogen phosphate to 550 °C, a method first developed in 1955:

The trimetaphosphate dissolves in water and is precipitated by the addition of sodium chloride (common ion effect), affording the hexahydrate. STMP can also prepared by heating samples of sodium polyphosphate, or by a thermal reaction of orthophosphoric acid and sodium chloride at 600°C.

Hydrolysis of the ring leads to the acyclic sodium triphosphate:
Na3P3O9  +  H2O  →  H2Na3P3O10
The analogous reaction of the metatriphosphate anion involves ring-opening by amine nucleophiles.

References

Food additives
Sodium compounds
Metaphosphates